Pallavi Model Schools, is a group of English medium co-educational schools affiliated to the Central Board of Secondary Education, New Delhi, India. CBSE Curriculum from Class I to XII.
The Pallavi educational society has initiated Pallavi Model School in June 1994. The Pallavi Group of schools celebrated its Silver Jubilee in 2019

Branches

Pallavi Model School, Bowenpally 
The main branch is present in Hasmathpet, Bowenpally. It teaches kindergarten and grades 1–12. The silver jubilee celebrations of the school was held in November 2019.

Pallavi Model School, Alwal

Pallavi Model School, Boduppal

Pallavi Model School, Gandipet

Pallavi Model School, Saroornagar

Akshara Vaagdevi International School, TIvoli 

There are seven branches of pre school chain named Pallavi KIDZ. They are in:
Mahendra Hills 
Manikonda 
Tarnaka 
Sainikpuri 
DD Colony 
Kavuri Hills 
Habsiguda

References

External links 
 https://www.pallavimodelschools.org/bowenpally/

Schools in Hyderabad, India
Schools in Telangana
International Baccalaureate schools in India
Educational institutions established in 1994
1994 establishments in Andhra Pradesh